Leitrim railway station was on the Great Northern Railway (Ireland) which ran from Banbridge to Castlewellan in Northern Ireland, this station was situated in the village of Leitrim.

The Leitrim railway station opened in early 1906 and was regularly used.

The station was closed in early 1955 and left in disrepair. The station was eventually demolished entirely.

An estate in Leitrim was named “Old Railway Close” in reference to the railway line that used to run through the village.

Train line

References 

Disused railway stations in County Down
Railway stations opened in 1906
Railway stations closed in 1955
1906 establishments in Ireland
Railway stations in Northern Ireland opened in the 20th century